Craignish is a coastal locality in the Fraser Coast Region, Queensland, Australia. In the  Craignish had a population of 1,827 people.

Geography 
The locality is bounded to the west by Toogoom Cane Road, to north-west by O'Regan Creek and to the north by the coast overlooking Hervey Bay.

History 
Craignish State School opened on 24 January 1938 on land donated by Mrs Elizabeth (Lizzie) Campbell whose husband Robert had named his property at Dundowran Craignish (a Scottish name meaning rugged rocky place) so the school took this name as a "token of gratitude". The school closed in 1961. It was located at approx 471 Craignish Road. This is presumably the origin of the locality name.

O'Reagan Creek takes its name from Maurice (Morry) O'Regan (1835-1920) who was a pioneer timbergetter in the area.

In the  Craignish had a population of 1,827 people.

References

External links 

 

Fraser Coast Region
Coastline of Queensland
Localities in Queensland